The Cortez pikeblenny (Chaenopsis coheni) is a species of chaenopsid blenny found around the Isla Angel de la Guarda, in the Gulf of California, in the eastern central Pacific ocean. It has not been recorded since 1965. The specific name honours Daniel M. Cohen (1930-2017) of Stanford University who accompanied Böhlke on the expedition that collected the type.

References
 Böhlke, J. E. 1957 (26 July) A review of the blenny genus Chaenopsis, and the description of a related new genus from the Bahamas. Proceedings of the Academy of Natural Sciences of Philadelphia v. 109: 81-103, Pls. 5–6.

coheni
Fish of the Gulf of California
Fish of Mexican Pacific coast
Fish described in 1957
Taxa named by James Erwin Böhlke